Sinclair Smith ( in Chicago –  in Pasadena) was an American astronomer. His observations of the Virgo Cluster were among the first to suggest the existence of dark matter.

Biography 
In 1906, his parents took him to Italy for two years, then to Indiana, where they lived until 1913, when they moved to California.

As a child, he showed a great interest in mechanical design and drawing. He was hired as a draughtsman for the design of the Mount Wilson Observatory's 100-inch (2.5-metre) Hooker telescope.

He received his bachelor's degree from the California Institute of Technology (Caltech) in 1921, and in 1924, he obtained his Ph.D. for his work with John August Anderson on the exploding wire method,  to obtain laboratory spectra at high excitation and ionization energies.

He then spent a year at the Cavendish Laboratory at Cambridge University, and worked at the physics laboratory of the Mount Wilson Observatory for the rest of his life.

He died prematurely of cancer at the age of 39.

Publications

References

Appendices

Bibliography

Biography 
 [Necrology] .
 .
 .

Other works 
 .

External links 

1899 births
1938 deaths
American astronomers
Fellows of the American Physical Society